Choe Deok-sin (September 17, 1914 – November 14, 1989) was a South Korean Foreign Minister who later defected with his wife, Ryu Mi-yong, to North Korea.

Choe was born in Uiju County, North Pyongan Province. In 1936, he graduated from the Republic of China Military Academy, and served as a Republic of China Army officer. When World War II ended, Choe was promoted to colonel. After the war Choe returned to South Korea and entered the national army academy as a second lieutenant. In 1949, Choe entered the United States Military Academy. On July 14, 1950, Choe returned to South Korea. Choe served as a commanding general of the South Korean 11th Division under the United States IX Corps during the Korean War. His division carried out the  Sancheong-Hamyang and Geochang massacres. After the military coup, from 1961 to 1963, Choe served as a Foreign Minister and Ambassador to West Germany.

In 1986, Choe relocated with his wife Ryu Mi-yong to North Korea from their exile in the United States, where they had been known for their opposition to the policies of the South Korean military government. Choe served as a chief of the central committee of the Chondogyo religious movement and vice-chairman of the Committee for the Peaceful Reunification of the Fatherland. Choe's son, Choe In-guk, reportedly defected to North Korea in July 2019.

Bibliography

See also

Sancheong-Hamyang massacre
Geochang massacre
South Korean defectors
North Korean defectors
Hwang Jang-yop, Chairman of the Supreme People's Assembly of North Korea, highest-ranking defector from the North

References

1914 births
1989 deaths
People from Uiju County
Chondoist Chongu Party politicians
Foreign ministers of South Korea
Government ministers of South Korea
Ambassadors of South Korea to West Germany
South Korean diplomats
South Korean generals
Military personnel of the Republic of China in the Second Sino-Japanese War
South Korean military personnel of the Korean War
Republic of China Military Academy alumni
South Korean defectors
South Korean emigrants to North Korea